Instruments used specially in Toxicology are as follows:

Instrument list

References 

Pathology
Biochemistry
Toxicology